Comano is a town and comune in the province of Massa and Carrara, Tuscany, Italy, of some 700 inhabitants.

In the nearby is the pieve of Santa Maria Assunta. It was rebuilt in 1079 in Romanesque style; later it was modified in Renaissance and Baroque times. It has also a castle.

History
Comano was part of the territory of Spinetta Malaspina the Great who let the inheritance to his successors when he died (1352): Gabriele, Gugliemo and Galeotto Malaspina, sons of Azzolino II (brother of Spinetta) who therefore wore the title of Signori di Fosdinovo, Marciaso, Comano and Le Terre dei Bianchi.

Subsequently Comano became part of the Marquis of Fivizzano, and then under the Republic of Florence in 1478.

With the Unity of Italy Comano was an outlying town of the municipality of Fivizzano and continued to be until 26 April 1918 when it became an autonomous municipality.

Geography
Comano is situated in the area of Lunigiana in Tuscany, with the main town at the head of the Taverone valley with a backdrop of the breathtaking Apennine Mountains. There are many walking trails leading from the town centre of Comano and the surrounding villages to the hills and mountain peaks. The town, surrounded by the farming community, hosts an annual horse festival in the summer and offers a good selection of shops, restaurants and sport facilities.

The Taverone river has crystal clear waters with waterfalls and rock pools popular in the summer. The area is renowned locally for its pure mountain air and attracts tourism looking for contact with nature.

Comano includes many outlying villages with medieval castles, cobbled lanes and interlinking arches. Comano offers numerous farm restaurants serving local specialities which include pattona, a pancake cake made from chestnut flour served with fresh ricotta cheese, wild mushrooms, ravioli pasta and vegetable cakes. The area also produces honey from wild flowers and also chestnut honey which is often served with the local cheese.

The landscape varies from green pastures, chestnut hills and stretches to the high Apennine range. Comano is part of Lungiana, an area that stretches from the coast to the Apennine mountain ridges.

Frazioni
The municipality of Comano comprises three main villages: Comano ( alt., population 277), Castello ( alt., population 55) and Piano ( alt., population 123).

The territory of Comano also comprises many outlying villages: Cabeva, Camporaghena, Campungano, Canola, Casa Pelati, Castello, Castello di Camporaghena, Cassettana, Castagneto di Crespiano, Cattognano, Chiosi, Crespiano, Croce, Felegara, Fontana Rosa, Fumagna, Imocomano, La Costa, Lagastrello, La Greta, La Piana-Groppo San Pietro, La Vigna-Ropiccio, Linari, Montalbino-Battagliolo, Montale, Monterotondo, Piagneto, Piano, Pieve di Crespiano, Prato Castellano, Prota, Scanderaruola, Summocomano, Torsana, and Villa di Cattognano.

Of historical interest: Camporaghena, Cattognano, Crespiano, Groppo San Pietro, Montale, Prota, and Scanderaruola e Torsana.

Main sights
 Church of San Giorgio
 Church of San Giovanni Battista in the village of Montale
 Church of Santi Pietro e Paolo in the village of Camporaghena
 Church of San Genesio in the village of Prota
 Church of San Giacomo in the village of Torsana
 Ancient church Pieve di Santa Maria Assunta in the village of Crespiano
 Castle of Comano
 Castle of Groppo San Pietro

References

External links 
 

Cities and towns in Tuscany
Castles in Italy